Westown is a suburb of New Plymouth, in the western North Island of New Zealand. It is located to the southwest of the city centre and west of Frankleigh Park.

Taranaki Base Hospital lies between Westown and Lynmouth. Yarrow Stadium is a rugby union ground in Westown.

Demographics

Westown had a population of 4,404 at the 2018 New Zealand census, an increase of 138 people (3.2%) since the 2013 census, and an increase of 177 people (4.2%) since the 2006 census. There were 1,803 households, comprising 2,157 males and 2,247 females, giving a sex ratio of 0.96 males per female. The median age was 37.7 years (compared with 37.4 years nationally), with 876 people (19.9%) aged under 15 years, 813 (18.5%) aged 15 to 29, 1,857 (42.2%) aged 30 to 64, and 858 (19.5%) aged 65 or older.

Ethnicities were 82.4% European/Pākehā, 19.1% Māori, 2.5% Pacific peoples, 6.8% Asian, and 2.1% other ethnicities. People may identify with more than one ethnicity.

The percentage of people born overseas was 16.0, compared with 27.1% nationally.

Although some people chose not to answer the census's question about religious affiliation, 50.3% had no religion, 37.2% were Christian, 0.5% had Māori religious beliefs, 0.5% were Hindu, 0.7% were Muslim, 0.7% were Buddhist and 1.7% had other religions.

Of those at least 15 years old, 603 (17.1%) people had a bachelor's or higher degree, and 813 (23.0%) people had no formal qualifications. The median income was $26,800, compared with $31,800 nationally. 429 people (12.2%) earned over $70,000 compared to 17.2% nationally. The employment status of those at least 15 was that 1,596 (45.2%) people were employed full-time, 510 (14.5%) were part-time, and 135 (3.8%) were unemployed.

Education
Francis Douglas Memorial College is a boys' secondary (years 7-13) school with a roll of  students as of  It is a state-integrated Catholic school, founded in 1959.

Westown School is a coeducational contributing primary (years 1-6) school with a roll of  students as of  The school celebrated its 75th jubilee in 2000.

Notes

Further reading

Churches

Community Church

Methodist

School

External links
 Francis Douglas Memorial College website
 Westown School website

Suburbs of New Plymouth